National Highway 203A is a part of National Highway 203 and connects Puri and Satpada in Odisha, India. It covers a distance of 49 km. It passes through Brahmagiri. New Jagannath Sadak connects NH 203 (A) with NH 5 AND NH 224 .

See also
 National Highways Development Project
 New Jagannath Sadak

References

203A
National highways in India (old numbering)